Vladimir Radivojević (born 4 February 1986) is a Serbian professional footballer who plays as a midfielder for Mladost Lučani.

Career
In the summer of 2009, Radivojević was acquired by Serbian First League club Mladost Lučani. He played regularly for the side over the next two seasons, scoring 10 league goals in 59 appearances. In the summer of 2011, after refusing to sign a new contract with the club, Radivojević was ejected from his hotel accommodation and required to attend training sessions separately from the rest of the team.

In June 2016, Radivojević returned to Mladost Lučani. He helped the club earn a spot in the 2017–18 UEFA Europa League qualifiers and reach the 2017–18 Serbian Cup final. During the 2018–19 Serbian SuperLiga, Radivojević scored a career-high 10 goals in 34 appearances.

Career statistics

Honours
Mladost Lučani
 Serbian Cup: Runner-up 2017–18

References

External links
 
 

Association football midfielders
FK Borac Čačak players
FK Javor Ivanjica players
FK Loznica players
FK Mladost Lučani players
FK Novi Pazar players
FK Rad players
FK Radnički Klupci players
Second League of Serbia and Montenegro players
Serbia and Montenegro footballers
Serbian First League players
Serbian footballers
Serbian SuperLiga players
Sportspeople from Loznica
1986 births
Living people